Geron Tocka (born 16 August 1999) is an Albanian professional footballer who plays as an attacking midfielder for Greek Super League 2 club Iraklis.

References

1999 births
Living people
Albanian footballers
2. Liga (Slovakia) players
Football League (Greece) players
Super League Greece 2 players
FK Dukla Banská Bystrica players
Iraklis Thessaloniki F.C. players
Association football midfielders
Footballers from Thessaloniki
Greek footballers
Albanians in Greece
Greek expatriate sportspeople in Slovakia
Expatriate footballers in Slovakia
Greek expatriate footballers
Albanian expatriate sportspeople in Greece
Expatriate footballers in Greece
Albanian expatriate sportspeople in Slovakia
Albanian expatriate footballers